Abdulrahman Mohammed Abdulaziz (Arabic:عبد الرحمن محمد) (born 6 January 1994) is a Qatari footballer. He currently plays for Al-Sailiya .

External links

References

Qatari footballers
1994 births
Living people
Al-Sailiya SC players
Al-Markhiya SC players
Qatar Stars League players
Qatari Second Division players
Place of birth missing (living people)
Association football goalkeepers